The Scott and Gary Show was a public-access television cable TV variety show that ran from 1983 to 1989 and featured punk and indie bands, live audience dance parties, and comedy skits. Created and hosted by Scott Lewis and Gary Winter, the show was filmed in New York City from 1983 to 1986 and, at the invitation of cable access producer Jeff Krulik, in the Washington, D.C., metro area, from 1986 to 1989.

The show is notable for early appearances of bands such as the Butthole Surfers and the Beastie Boys (who appear with drummer Kate Schellenbach, later of Luscious Jackson). Other musical guests include the Ben Vaughn Combo, Raunch Hands, Half Japanese, Shockabilly, R. Stevie Moore, and Velvet Monkeys.

As of July 2017 all The Scott and Gary Show episodes became available to view on Nightflight Plus. The show has also been included in the Museum of The Moving Image exhibition TV Party: A Panorama of Public Access Television in New York City in 2011 and in the 2021 Museum of the City of New York exhibition New York, New Music 1980-1986.

A Chronological History of The Scott & Gary Show* 

Ben Vaughn Combo—December 1983: The famous first episode of The Scott & Gary show, filmed in Black and White. Ben went on to write theme music for Third Rock and That '70s Show, and has worked with classic artists like Charlie Feathers, Joe South and Alan Vega. Features the original combo of Lonesome Bob on drums, Aldo Jones on stand-up bass and Gus on accordion.
Beastie Boys—January 1984: Little Beastie Boys and Girl (Kate Schellenbach of Luscious Jackson), during the era of “Cookie Puss” mania. See the early stages of their charm in insightful interview. Driving them to the studio they went on about how they shouldn’t have to do small stuff like cable and that they were going to be big stars. Took us twenty years to figure out that one of the songs they performed, “Egg Raid on Mojo” was about them tossing eggs at a bouncer who wouldn’t let them into a bar.
½ Japanese—February 1984: Prime ½ Jap. Personal victory for S & G was getting these superstars. Brother David did not make the trip. With Don Fleming (Gumball) on guitar, the brilliant Jon Dreyfuss on sax and Mark Jickling on guitar. This was our Valentine’s Day Show, which gave Scott the opportunity to wear red. Sure laugh now, but back then red overalls looked pretty hip. 
R. Stevie Moore—April 1984: The original home cassette artist (close to 250 releases), and son of Sun session man Bob Moore makes a very rare live appearance. The Nashville transplant weaves his cult like influence over all who require a daily dose of eccentric pop. About 1 hour after the taping this episode was available on cassette through Stevie’s mail order catalog! Talk about quick turnaround. 
Raunch Hands—April 1984: New York Crunchabilly. Rip snorting stampede of roots rock and roll fueled by Alligator Wine. One of our favorite bands who actually opened for The Banshees at Radio City! A great bunch’o’guys who have had numerous releases. They later wound up living in Spain spreading that good ole’ rock and roll religion. 
Curtis A—May 1984: Recording for cool indie label Twin Tone, a native Minnesota-ian, and living in a comic book shop (no joke) made Curtis a natural for us. His disk was full of hard plucked electric guitar ditties with some out-there lyrics. Producing this episode was a wee tense. Twin Tone kept promising that Curtis was going to call.  But he said he had lots of trouble finding a phone. The label rep said we have this other band called The Replacements you might be interested in having. Scott told them let’s see how this one comes off first. Truth was we had seen The Replacements play their first show at Folk City and they were b-o-r-i-n-g. 
Butthole Surfers—October 1984: It was the Butthole’s first trip to the big city and we caught them in all their psychedelic desert drug haze glory. Following in the footsteps of fellow Texans the Thirteenth Floor Elevators, they unleashed a devastating performance. Priceless interview too. Gibby informs Scott of the pride he felt in his former occupation as an accountant. Buttholes actually wanted Scott to go with them to MTV the next day and screen the tape. Scott said no thanks, thinking that if he went with them he would never be seen again. We later learned that this episode was used as an example of the dangers of Public Access programming at some symposium in Sacramento!  
The Johnsons—January 1985: Intense pop rock with moody introspective lyrics. This episode includes a commercial for the cult film, “Terminator Exterminator”. Scott attempts the spinning plate on a pole shtick he had seen on The Ed Sullivan Show. To avoid injury he used paper plates. 
No King—February 1985: Containing past members of D.C. legendary Chumps along with future Workdogs, No King sounded the way Scott thought The Dream Syndicate was supposed to sound. Their manic beat urban dramas were the perfect accompaniment to our fancy black dress cocktail party. Inspired by Playboy After Dark, this episode was the social event of the season. The black tie audience spilled onto the stairs and around the studio drinking champagne and eating hors d'oeuvres.  
Woofing Cookies—March 1985: The Cookies were a very young band of garage poppers. They gained a footnote in music history by being the band that decided to go to Athens Georgia and showed up on the front porch of REM’s Peter Buck’s home and begged him to produce a 45, which he did. 
Shockabilly—March 1985: Dr. Eugene Chadbourne, future Shimmy Disc impresario Kramer and drummer Licht. Scott gets a lesson in playing the electric garden rake. The Shockers played one of their prototypical alternative freak-outs. This episode also featured the suave Danny Barfman and his Dating Service. Television at its anarchic best. 
Alter Boys—December 1985: Come all ye Heathens to this Christmas episode. Oh wait! It’s the kind of Alter Boy that believes thou shalt be pummeled with sonic intertwining guitars. On this episode Gary decides to use Danny Barfman’s video dating service. He’s still waiting for a response. 
The Clintons—December 1985: This was our Bar Mitzvah episode, number 13. We needed a real man’s band and got it with the Clintons' twangy country rock with a hint of glam. The Clintons were staple of New York’s cow punk scene, and this episode had the best looking couples ever seen slow dancing on Public Access TV. Scott & Gary did their wrestling promo years before it was considered good family entertainment. The Clintons management was also involved with Natalie Merchant and Whatever Number of Maniacs. They said they would love to be on. Truth was Scott had seen them at Folk City one night thought they were b-o-r-i-n-g.  
The Rhomboids—March 1986: Our first episode taped in Maryland, our first one-hour show, and no one knew quite what to expect. We had established a relationship with kindred spirit Jeff Krulik who ran the Public Access Studio, who kindly invited us to tape some episodes. We knew just a few folks in the area, but our show had been airing there and was getting good feedback. The feedback must have spread because we had a fantastic turnout! It was a pure 1960’s psychedelic fuzz punk happening. With inspiration from such role models as The Seeds and The Chocolate Watchband, The Rhomboids delivered the goods nicely wrapped with paisley sport jackets and candelabras. The Slickee Boys mythical Kim Kane presented Scott & Gary with the keys to the city! Throw in some of the finest looking go-go chicks around and an infomercial for singing sensations, The Yeah Brothers, and we were an instant hit in the land of crab cakes.  
Velvet Monkeys—March 1986: The legendary show that was broadcast live. Maryland suburbanites still talk about it. The idea was that Scott & Gary would do the show in our underwear, the joke being that we lost our luggage on the trip down. The Velvet Monkeys featured Don Fleming (darling indie producer of Hole, Alice Cooper, etc.), and did sort of a Led Zep send-up in full rock-star regalia. Mr. Fleming played the part of the surly star to the hilt. During the interview Scott pinged him on the head with a toy squeaky hammer, thinking this would bring him to his senses. Fleming leapt on top of Scott and started wrestling with him! Everyone thought it was a joke! Gary, carrying a spear, came running in. He also thought it was a gag until he got to the stage and saw the fists flying. The whole band got involved and serious mayhem broke loose. Viewers called the station saying what the hell is going on...you got guys in their underwear wrestling guys in wigs! 
The Beatnik Flies—February 1987: Members of the tangerine marshmallow underground ring true like a Carnaby Street dream. In this episode Gary and I face off in the battle of the Jerry Colonna ("who?”) impersonators. Scott opened the show with an impassioned plea for First Amendment tolerance. See, we had been distributing our show to public access systems in NYC, Boston, Austin, Minnesota and San Francisco. We thought Seattle would be a great addition. However, Seattle did not feel likewise. It seems a Ms. H at Seattle Public Access deemed us unsuitable due to “numerous references to sex and drinking of alcohol on camera by High School students”. We thought it hilarious that this open-minded tastemaker took the show so seriously. Well, we never had high school students on the show. See, as a way of paying homage to teen dance shows of the past Scott would ask the bands what High School they went to, usually getting very funny answers. We had also sprinkled sparkle confetti on the floor to create a neat effect.  Jeff said not to do that again; the stuff was showing up for months in adjacent offices, conference rooms, etc.  It got management wondering what went on during weekends. 
Das Yahoos—February 1987: Crawling from the swamp that had birthed Philadelphia’s fabled Sick Kids, the Yahoos put the rockin’ in rockin’ bones. They had just worked on an EP with Lux and Ivy of the Cramps producing and were itching to spread their batwings and let it rip.  Gary and I also drove to the hoop to play some one on one and give a strong argument for 1970’s style tight fitting basketball shorts. 
Beatoes—April 1989: Always blazing (behind) TV’s ever changing technology, Scott and Gary attempt Public Access’s first 3D broadcast! Featuring the quirky nerd pop and poetic flourishes of the Beatoes. Hailing from inner city Baltimore the band presented matching shirts, wry lyrics, and odes to polyester slacks and Mad Dog 20/20. This was the second band to feature an electric rake. Scott and Gary also pay tribute to the great serials of the past with episode II of “Flying Man”; aluminum- helmeted defender of earth. We also show our concern for the environment with a special report from one Exxon’s scientist on how to cook fish covered in oil. 
Ben Vaughn—April 1989: We thought it proper to start inviting back some of our favorite guests to see how they were and what they were up to.  Well, the talented Mr. Vaughn was up to mucho.  He drove his ‘67 Rambler into the audience’s hearts singing songs about love gone not-too-good, love gotten better, dumping your lover and keeping your lover forever.  And then something about France and Jerry Lewis. Providing the sensitive accompaniment was the delicate Aldo “Powderhead” Jones.  Besides espousing on the finer points of ballet, there is concrete video evidence of Jim Morrison still living and episode III of Flying Man.  Since Ben was in a rush to leave after the show, Scott was able to catch him for a little chat on the fly. That’s right; the interview took place in the Men’s room. Don’t mind those folks in the back using the urinal. And how did that woman pee standing up? 

*From the Archives of The Scott & Gary Show

Notes

External links
The Scott and Gary Show! on Night Flight Plus 
Scott and Gary Show Facebook page
Scott Lewis's website
Guide to the Scott and Gary Show Archive at NYU's Fales Library
Museum of the Moving Image: TV Party: A Panorama of Public Access Television in New York City
Museum of the Moving Image: Un-TV
Museum of the Moving Image TV Party Reunion Panel 
The Wall Street Journal: Before the Web, It Was Public-Access
The Village Voice: Freaks & Geeks
Alamo Drafthouse Cinema: The Scott & Gary Show
Sheepshead Bites: Beastie Boys clip, Scott & Gary Show
New York, New Music: how the city became a hotbed for music in the 80s | Music | The Guardian

1980s American variety television series
1983 American television series debuts
1989 American television series endings
American public access television shows